Bathycongrus polyporus is an eel in the family Congridae (conger/garden eels). It was described by David G. Smith and Robert H. Kanazawa in 1977, originally under the genus Rhechias. It is a marine, deep water-dwelling eel which is known from the Straits of Florida and the northern coast of Cuba, in the western central Atlantic Ocean. It dwells at a depth range of 439–549 meters. Males can reach a maximum total length of 43 centimeters.

The species epithet "polyporus" means "many pored" in Ancient Greek, and refers to the large quantity of pores in the eel's lateralis system.

References

polyporus
Taxa named by David G. Smith
Taxa named by Robert H. Kanazawa
Fish described in 1977